The Piano Sonata in F-sharp minor  571, was composed by Franz Schubert in July 1817. The sonata was first published long after the composer's death in 1888 by Breitkopf & Härtel.

The sonata is incomplete, consisting of only a single movement, and even that was abandoned by the composer before completion. Other hands, such as Howard Ferguson, Noël Lee, and Martino Tirimo, have attempted to realise Schubert's assumed intentions. These hypothetical completions of the sonata have been drawn from such separately published pieces as the piece (usually assumed to be an Andante) in A major, D. 604, and the Allegro vivace in D major and Allegro in F-sharp minor, D. 570.

Movement 
I. Allegro moderato

F-sharp minor. Fragment (breaks off at the end of the development, implying a recapitulation in the subdominant, B minor)

(II. D. 604)

A major. In sonata form without development. Unusually, the second subject group is in the subdominant key of D major.

(III. Scherzo: Allegro vivace - Trio, D. 570)

D major

(IV. Allegro, D. 570)

F-sharp minor. Fragment (breaks off at the end of the development)

References

Sources
 Tirimo, Martino. Schubert: The Complete Piano Sonatas. Vienna: Wiener Urtext Edition, 1997.

External links 
 

Piano sonatas by Franz Schubert
Compositions in F-sharp minor